Sir Robert John Peliza KBE GMH ED (16 November 1920 – 12 December 2011) was a Gibraltarian politician.

Career 
He founded and led the Integration with Britain Party and was the second Chief Minister of Gibraltar serving in office from 6 August 1969 to 25 June 1972. He was one of the members of the Constitutional Conference chaired by Malcolm Shepherd, 2nd Baron Shepherd in 1968 that drafted Gibraltar's first Constitution. Peliza was also Speaker of the Gibraltar House of Assembly from 1992 to 1996 and Honorary Colonel of the Royal Gibraltar Regiment from 1993 to 1999.

Peliza died on 12 December 2011 at St Bernard's Hospital in Gibraltar at the age of 91.

See also
 List of Gibraltarians
 Politics of Gibraltar

References

1920 births
2011 deaths
Chief Ministers of Gibraltar
Knights Commander of the Order of the British Empire
Integration with Britain Party politicians
Speakers of the Gibraltar Parliament